Samsonovo , rural localities in Russia, may refer to:

 Samsonovo, Altai Krai, a selo
 Samsonovo, Arkhangelsk Oblast, a village
 Samsonovo, Ivanovo Oblast, a village
 Samsonovo, Kaluga Oblast, a village
 Samsonovo, Kursk Oblast, a village
 Samsonovo, Omsk Oblast, a selo
 Samsonovo, Pskov Oblast, a village
 Samsonovo, Smolensk Oblast, a village
 Samsonovo, Toropetsky District, Tver Oblast, a village
 Samsonovo, Udomelsky District, Tver Oblast, a village
 Samsonovo, Vologda Oblast, a village

 See also
 Samsonov